The Bank of China Building is a tower located at No. 23 on the Bund, in Shanghai, People's Republic of China. Previously the headquarters of the Bank of China, it now houses the Shanghai Branch of the Bank of China.

It was built on the site of the old German Club. It housed the headquarters of the Bank of China. The stunted appearance of the building is attributed to Victor Sassoon's insistence that no other building on the Bund could rise higher than his.

History
No. 23, the Bund was previously the German Club. During World War I, the Chinese government declared war on Germany, and confiscated the German Club as enemy assets. At the end of World War I, the Bank of China purchased the property from the government for 630,000 silver yuan.

In 1928, the Bank of China moved its headquarters from Beijing to Shanghai. The Bank of China purchased land in Jinkee Road (now Dianchi Road) and Yuenmingyuen Road (now Yuanmingyuan Road) in 1930 to house its headquarters. From then on, the Shanghai branch would each year set aside RMB 500,000 from its surplus, as the construction fund for a new headquarters building. In April 1934, the board of directors decided to construct an 18-floor building, for the office administration and operation of the Head Office and the Shanghai Branch, on the former German Club site. The estimated basic construction cost was 6 million silver yuan.

A primary reason why the bank officials want to have the building in the Bund concession was according to Zhang Jia'ao, the then president of the Bank of China states because "Bank of China had endured hardship and thrived. Since its infrastructure had been reformed and it was strong enough to compete with those European and American banks on the Bund, it needed a new building, which could symbolize modernity, soundness and international credit."

In the original design, this building had 34 floors and would be the highest in the Far East. Actually, the current foundation was still strong enough for a 34-floor building. However, Victor Sassoon insisted that "any house built next to my building is not allowed to be higher than the spire of the Sassoon House". The Municipal Council of the British concession refused to issue the construction permit with an excuse of "Chinese were poor in designing ability and the 34-story building would do harm to the foundations of the surrounding buildings". Finally, the Bank of China building was cut nearly half, with a top height 1 foot lower than the nearby Sassoon House.

In September 1934, Bank of China established a special Management Council to deal with the construction of the building, chaired by Mr. Tsuyee Pei, Head Office's Overseas Department manager and Shanghai Branch manager. Tsuyee Pei was the father of architect I. M. Pei, who would later design the Bank of China Tower, Hong Kong. The design drafts were jointly prepared by a famous Shanghai design firm Palmer & Turner and Mr. Lu Qianshou (also: Luke Him Sau 1904 - 1991), the Chief Architect of the Bank of China. Dao Kee Construction Co., Ltd, a local firm, won the bid by proposing a budget of RMB 1.813 million for the 18-month project.

In 1935, the government of the Republic of China started restructuring the Central Bank, Bank of China and Bank of Communications. Bank of China, whose stocks were 80% publicly owned, became the target of plunder by various powers. It was forced to add RMB 15 million government stocks, making its total capital RMB 40 million, half public and half government owned. With this, the control fell into the hands of the government and T. V. Soong became chairman of Bank of China.

On October10, 1936, T. V. Soong presided over the foundation-laying ceremony of the Bank of China Tower at No. 23 on the Bund. On the day, the Shanghai Times carried a detailed report on the event. The original text reads:
"Bank of China to construct a building at Renji Road of the Bund. Our newspaper will keep you updated about its status. We are informed that the bank will hold a foundation-laying ceremony on 10:00 am today (Double Ten Festival). The presence of local financial professionals is appreciated. 
The building was topped out in 1937. Right then, the War of Resistance against Japan broke out, which postponed the completion. In 1941, it served as the office of the reserve bank of Wang Jingwei's illegitimate government; it had been turned over to the Central Bank after the victory against the Japanese. After several rounds of negotiations, Bank of China didn't move to that building till the New Year of 1946, ten years from the time it was built.

Features

The east building is the main structure with 15 floors facing the Bund. The ground floor has a higher ceiling, plus two floors underground, making a total of 17 floors. The west building is an annex on four floors. The overall outlook carries a traditional Chinese style, clad in smooth Jinshan stones. Its top is a pyramid with a square base. Parts of the brackets are decorated with stone door arches. A cut-out of the Chinese character for "longevity" can be spotted on both sides of each floor, imparting a calm and peaceful air to the grand construction. Traditional decorations are also adopted for the flower patterns and panes on the railing.

In Shanghai's international concessions, the erection of the Bank of China Tower among numerous foreign buildings, a building funded by the bank and constructed by Chinese workers and combining the Chinese and Western architectural styles, has broken the foreign dominance of Shanghai's grand buildings. In other words, it has again demonstrated Bank of China's determination to compete with western banks in China.

Mr. Soong Tse-ven, chairman of Bank of China, will lay the foundation stone in person. Mrs. Song (Madam Zhong Leyi) will put the commemorative box under the foundation stone. According to sources, drawings of the new building, photos of scenes on the Bund, various local newspapers, various fractional currencies, exchange certificates from Bank of China, list of employees, recent yearbooks of the bank, and among others, are hid inside the box. The bank occupies an area of 55,000 square chi, with its east facing the Bund, its south neighboring Renji Road and the west bordering Yuanmingyuan Road. The underground is 13 chi into the soil. Considering the loose soil of Shanghai, its adjacency to high building on three sides, its closeness to the Bund and the din produced by cars on the street, the difficulties of digging are evident. Although the foundation has not been completed for now, we can tell how grand the construction plan is by simply judging from the completed part. It is told that the outlook of the building will convey a sense of magnificence through a simple style. The surrounding wall in the lower part will use granites from Suzhou. The 18-floor building tops 227 feet, featuring both the modern architectural styles and the typical Chinese forms. The floor area of the underground is quite huge, equaling the total footprint. A parking lot was built at the entrance on Yuanmingyuan Road. Its equipment including the reserve and safe are quite refined and solid. The total number of safes amounts to over 10,000. The new building serves many functions: one for the head office, one of the Shanghai Branch, and another for leasing. Rumors have it that various institutions under the central government will lease the foyer on the ground floor for their offices. The ground floor also hosts two key functions of the bank: circulation and cashing. On the first floor, there stays the Trust Department, the Savings Department, the Marketing Subsection and the office for the vice manager of the Shanghai Branch. The Marketing Subsection occupies an area above 15,000 square chi, with a half-circle ceiling in height of around 35 feet. The 2nd floor and the third floor are home to various departments of the Head Office and offices for senior employees. A living room, lounge, gym and clinic can be found on the 4th floor. In addition, there is a cafeteria which can accommodate 400 people and a lecture room capable of accommodating 375 people. The architect estimates that the overall weight of the new building will reach 70,000 tons. 2000 trunks, each in 100-foot length, are needed to support this weight. Dozens of nouveau and super-speed elevators are installed inside the building, being completely automatic and with a maximum speed at 500 feet per minute. All offices will be equipped with air conditioning, heating pipes, water pipes and fire equipment.

The total length of metal pipes utilized is 20 miles. Cables used for lights, telephone, bells and various alarms total above 70 miles. The bank will dig two wells, each in depth of 700 chi, contributing a pumping capacity of 600 gallons of water a minute. Upon the completion of its internal installation, the building will become a giant structure in Shanghai.

References

External links

 
 Old Bank of China Building
 Buildings of the Bund

Art Deco architecture in Shanghai
Bank of China
The Bund
Bank headquarters in China
Office buildings completed in 1937